Elections to Fermanagh District Council were held on 15 May 1985 on the same day as the other Northern Irish local government elections. The election used four district electoral areas to elect a total of 23 councillors.

Election results

Note: "Votes" are the first preference votes.

Districts summary

|- class="unsortable" align="centre"
!rowspan=2 align="left"|Ward
! % 
!Cllrs
! % 
!Cllrs
! %
!Cllrs
! %
!Cllrs
! %
!Cllrs
! %
!Cllrs
!rowspan=2|TotalCllrs
|- class="unsortable" align="center"
!colspan=2 bgcolor="" | UUP
!colspan=2 bgcolor="" | Sinn Féin
!colspan=2 bgcolor="" | SDLP
!colspan=2 bgcolor="" | DUP
!colspan=2 bgcolor="" | IIP
!colspan=2 bgcolor="white"| Others
|-
|align="left"|Enniskillen
|bgcolor="40BFF5"|36.7
|bgcolor="40BFF5"|3
|17.9
|2
|15.1
|1
|16.4
|1
|4.7
|0
|9.2
|0
|7
|-
|align="left"|Erne East
|31.6
|2
|bgcolor="#008800"|37.4
|bgcolor="#008800"|3
|17.3
|1
|9.4
|0
|2.9
|0
|1.4
|0
|6
|-
|align="left"|Erne North
|bgcolor="40BFF5"|35.9
|bgcolor="40BFF5"|2
|11.9
|1
|22.9
|1
|21.7
|1
|4.7
|0
|2.9
|0
|5
|-
|align="left"|Erne West
|27.3
|1
|bgcolor="#008800"|31.9
|bgcolor="#008800"|2
|13.4
|1
|5.5
|0
|15.6
|1
|6.3
|0
|5
|- class="unsortable" class="sortbottom" style="background:#C9C9C9"
|align="left"| Total
|33.0
|8
|25.2
|8
|16.8
|4
|13.0
|2
|6.8
|1
|5.2
|0
|23
|-
|}

District results

Enniskillen

1985: 3 x UUP, 2 x Sinn Féin, 1 x DUP, 1 x SDLP

Erne East

1985: 3 x Sinn Féin, 2 x UUP, 1 x SDLP

Erne North

1985: 2 x UUP, 1 x SDLP, 1 x DUP, 1 x Sinn Féin

Erne West

1985: 2 x Sinn Féin, 1 x UUP, 1 x IIP, 1 x SDLP

References

1985 Northern Ireland local elections
20th century in County Fermanagh
Fermanagh District Council elections